Orhangazi Belediyespor is a football club located in Bursa, Turkey. The team competes in the Regional Amateur League. The club known as Orhangazispor changed into its new name in June 2017.

Stadium 
Currently the team plays at Orhangazi City Stadium.

References

External links 
Official website
Orhangazispor on TFF.org

TFF Third League clubs
Football clubs in Turkey